Kerri Sackville is an Australian Jewish author who publishes columns for the Sydney Morning Herald.

Sackville took a BA, majoring in English and linguistics. She works as a freelance writer.

Books

References

Australian Jews
Australian newspaper people
Year of birth missing (living people)
Living people